Insex was one of the biggest BDSM pornographic websites on the Internet and arguably the most extreme American pornographic production featuring female submissives. It was also a leading innovator in both live video streaming, pioneering the concept before broadband Internet access existed, and in the depiction of BDSM practices on the Internet. It existed from 1997 to 2005 and was run by Intersec Interactive Inc., a company owned by the website's creator, Brent Scott, former Carnegie Mellon professor, known on the site as "pd". Insex developed a cult following among BDSM enthusiasts due to its uncommonly severe and realistic depiction of sadomasochistic practices. It was also known for its interactive "Live Feeds" which allowed members to make direct suggestions and requests. In late 2006, Insex ended the production of original material, citing increased pressure from conservatives within the U.S. Justice Department.

Concept 
Insex.com offered primarily two forms of content, "Live Feeds" which could be watched through a live video stream and actively influenced in a simultaneous chat especially IRC between viewers and the website operator, and conventionally shot and edited videos that were the basis of regular updates. Most of the live feeds were later edited and presented as downloadable videos. Additionally, Insex offered so-called "Tests", compiled videos of women who had explored BDSM play at the hands of a professional producer and then decided not to return after a first test shoot. The website also provided a message board for paying members that was frequented by the staff and several of the more prominent models.

The videos were presented in RealVideo format, in the beginning with bitrates of 225 kbit/s, and later up to 450 kbit/s. Commonly, the updates were between 30 and 90 minutes in length, while the live feeds usually lasted several hours. On some occasions, models were online in BDSM live events for as long as 48 hours continuously. During such long sessions models had rest breaks, in which they could answer questions from viewers that were relayed from the message board or chat room. Starting in 2003, videos were occasionally shot in 16:9 widescreen aspect ratio with partly more artistic camera work.

The material included different aspects of BDSM, e.g. rope and metal bondage, heavy caning, flogging and whipping, as well as needle play, intimate examination, erotic asphyxiation, gagging, humiliation, electric stimulation/torture, interrogation, human animal roleplay, enemas, and urolagnia. Crucifixion and water torture were also explored, and would later inspire pay sites dedicated solely to those forms of BDSM. Videos often showed penetration with dildos and the use of vibrators, while sexual intercourse and oral sex were briefly shown on a small number of occasions.

One of the recurring themes of the videos was that models had to ask for permission before they had an orgasm during a scene. Models had a safeword that they occasionally used if their pain tolerance was exceeded or if they wished to quit the scene entirely; this was generally not cut out of the video. It was not uncommon that models would be visibly bruised at the end of a shoot, for instance from cane strokes or whipping, with marks that lasted for several weeks. However, no permanent injuries would be intentionally inflicted.

Because of the severity of an Insex shoot and the likelihood of visible marks, mainstream pornographic actresses normally did not work for the website due to the recovery time each shoot would require afterward. The majority of models were local women who answered an anonymous ad in a newspaper, although a small percentage of women had previous modeling or BDSM experience. Some women stated that they were not interested in BDSM sexually, but rather saw it as a physical and mental challenge that allowed them to test their abilities.

Models normally did not use ordinary stage names, but they were given numbers ("101", "912"), although some models were referred to by unusual verbal names ("Spacegirl", "Az", "Piglet"). The numeric names were usually based on the date that the model made her first test video shoot, "101" being October 1, "912" referring to September 12. Among the more popular models who worked for Insex were Sarah Jane Ceylon ("625"), Lorelei Lee ("Lorelei"), Adrianna Nicole ("Seven"), Liz Tyler 205 ("Cowgirl"), Gina Rae Michaels ("1020") Sharon Engert ("1016") and Wenona. Many prominent names in fetish modeling either started at Insex or passed through it at one point in their career, as did bondage riggers including such figures as Claire Adams, Cyd Black, Princess Donna, Matt Williams, and Damon Pierce, who all went on to work for the internet pornography company Kink.com. Because of this, Insex's artistic principles would influence the design and staging of many BDSM pay sites after its demise. Before Black's departure, Brent Scott asked him to create two new BDSM themed web sites, named Hardtied and Infernal Restraints, so Scott would have an avenue to continue to produce and sell content for the web without fearing interference from the government or the loss of credit card processing. Some mainstream pornographic models, such as Wenona, continue to perform for InfernalRestraints.com.

Intersec Interactive also created a website, InsexM, where female dominants dominated male submissives; it was shut down after a lack of interest among subscribers.

Shutdown
In the fall of 2005, Insex announced it was looking for a buyer, because "continuing to produce Insex.com from the U.S. would be too great a potential liability." This came as a result of attempts by the U.S. government to censor internet pornography, specifically by implementing an FBI anti-obscenity initiative in August 2005; an FBI memorandum stated that productions where the content includes "urination, defecation, as well as sadistic and masochistic behavior" would "most likely" be legally targeted. At that time the site revenue was about $50,000 per week but the FBI was putting pressure on the credit card company to dropping their business with Scott until eventually they couldn't process credit card and get payment from viewers. A statement on the Insex website explained, "while Intersec is certain that a potential prosecution would have no chance of success... the staff is unwilling to fight a lengthy and expensive court battle only to emerge victorious but bankrupt."

The website's entire content, over 500 movies, was offered for sale for US$4 million and reportedly bought for an undisclosed amount by a Dutch company. Parts of the Insex material are now offered as Insex Archives. The Insex videos are also traded on peer-to-peer networks and are also becoming increasingly available in low-quality bootlegged DVD form in sex shops scattered around Europe.

See also 
 Graphic Sexual Horror
 Kink.com

References 

BDSM organizations
Bondage pornography
American erotica and pornography websites
Internet properties established in 1997
Internet properties disestablished in 2005